Mahnken is a surname. Notable people with the surname include:

Harry Mahnken (1905–1995), American football coach
John Mahnken (1922–2000), American basketball player